CKCL may refer to:

 CKCL-FM, a radio station (107.1 FM) licensed to Winnipeg, Manitoba, Canada, which now holds the CKCL call sign since 2013.
 CKKS-FM, a radio station (104.9 FM) licensed to Chilliwack, British Columbia, Canada, which held the CKCL call sign from 2004 to 2009.
 CKTY-FM, a radio station (99.5 FM) licensed to Truro, Nova Scotia, Canada, which held the call sign CKCL from 1947 to 2001
 CKTO-FM, a radio station (100.9 FM) licensed to Truro, Nova Scotia, Canada, which held the call sign CKCL-FM from 1965 to the mid-1970s